KOZZ-FM (105.7 MHz) is a commercial radio station located in Reno, Nevada. The station airs a classic rock format.    Its studios are located on Plumb Lane in South Reno, and its transmitter is located on Slide Mountain.

The station signed on in 1971 as KGLR with a transmitter located on McClellan Peak. The KGLR call letters stood for Good Life Radio. It was once a news affiliate of NBC Radios The Source, which was geared to young adults.

The air-staff, which had previously executed a freeform rock music format patterned after San Francisco's KSAN, later adopted the newly created Superstars album-oriented rock (AOR) format designed by the programming consulting firm of Burkhardt, Douglass and Associates six months before. With its new, more accessible 'hit'-oriented programming, a good deal of 'street cred' built up as KGLR with the new young rock audience, popular personalities like Bruce Van Dyke, Daniel "The Sarge" Cook, Steve Funk, Chris "ZZ" Davis, Butch Johnson and later, Harry "The Happy Boy" Reynolds, Diane Michaels, Andy Schuon and Max Volume the station was positioned for long term success. The first song played on the new station was "Higher and Higher" by the Moody Blues. With exciting music and promotions, plus a new high-powered transmitter, KOZZ 105.7 "Reno's Best Rock" vaulted to the number 1 rated position Arbitron in the Reno Metro market, with listeners aged 12 and over, in the Spring survey of 1978. The programming staff maintained that position until fall 1987 despite a few significant personnel changes. The station adopted its current classic rock format in 1989.

References

External links
Official Website

OZZ-FM
Classic rock radio stations in the United States
Radio stations established in 1969
1969 establishments in Nevada
Lotus Communications stations